Newlands Cricket Ground is a South African cricket ground located in Cape Town, it has a capacity of 25,000. The ground hosted its first Test match in 1889 and its first One Day International (ODI) in 1992. 52 Test matches have been played at the ground as well as 36 ODIs.

The first Test match century scored at the ground was in 1889 by the Englishman Bobby Abel who made 120 against South Africa. 99 Test centuries have occurred at the ground, the highest of these was scored in 2006 by the New Zealander Stephen Fleming. Fleming's score of 262 from 423 deliveries is one of six double centuries the ground has seen, the others being 228, 209, 224, 258 and 201 scored by Herschelle Gibbs, Graeme Pollock, Jacques Kallis, Ben Stokes and Hashim Amla respectively. Jacques Kallis has scored the most Test centuries at the ground with nine.

The New Zealand batsman Roger Twose was the first player to score an ODI century at the ground, making 103 against South Africa. Brian Lara and Sourav Ganguly are the only other non-South African batsman to have scored an ODI century at Newlands.Faf du Plessis holds the record for the highest score with 185*. Herschelle Gibbs and AB de Villiers are the only batsmen to have scored two ODI centuries at the ground.

Key
 * denotes that the batsman was not out.
 Inns. denotes the number of the innings in the match.
 Balls denotes the number of balls faced in an innings.
 NR denotes that the number of balls was not recorded.
 Parentheses next to the player's score denotes his century number at the Newlands Cricket Ground.
 The column title Date refers to the date the match started.
 The column title Result refers to whether the player's team won, lost or if the match was drawn.

Test centuries

The following table summarises the Test centuries scored at Newlands.

One Day International centuries

The following table summarises the One Day International centuries scored at Newlands.

Women's Test centuries
The following table summarises the women's Test centuries scored at Newlands.

References 

Newlands
Cricket grounds in South Africa
Centuries
Centuries